Lecanora confusa is a species of corticolous (bark-dwelling), crustose lichen in the family Lecanoraceae. It was described as new to science in 1955 by Swedish lichenologist Ove Almborn. It is a member of the species complex resembling Lecanora polytropa.

Lecanora confusa has a granular to areolate thallus that forms small, smooth, green to yellow-grey patches. Its apothecia measure 0.4–0.7 mm, and have a pale yellowish-green, flat to convex . Its ascospores have a narrow ellipsoidal shape and measure 10–14 by 4–5 μm. The lichen contains several lichen products: usnic acid, zeorin, thiophanic acid, arthothelin, and some other xanthone compounds.

Lecanora confusa is widespread in Northern and Western Europe, with a range extending to southern Scandinavia. It also occurs in North America and in Macaronesia. It grows on the bark of twigs and branches of deciduous shrubs and trees, and occasionally on timber, especially in coastal areas.

See also
List of Lecanora species

References

confusa
Lichen species
Lichens described in 1955
Lichens of Southwestern Europe
Lichens of Northern Europe
Lichens of Central Europe
Lichens of Macaronesia
Lichens of North America